Pope Cyril V of Alexandria (Abba Kyrillos V), 112th Pope of Alexandria & Patriarch of the See of St. Mark for 52 years, 9 months and 6 days. He was the longest-serving Pope in the history of the Coptic Orthodox Church. He was born as Youhanna (John) in 1824 or 1830/1831 according to different accounts and he died on 7 August 1927.

A monk
He joined the Al Baramous Monastery in the Nitrian Desert, where he served as abbot prior to his elevation to Pope.

The Coptic Pope
The General Congregation Council (Elmagles Elmelly Ela'am) elected him Pope, with seat in the Saint Mark's Coptic Orthodox Cathedral in Azbakeya in Cairo throughout his papacy. The secretary of the council was Boutros pasha Ghali بطرس غالي, later Prime Minister of Egypt. Cyril spent most of his papacy at loggerheads with the council and objecting to its interference in church matters. At the beginning of his papacy there was a dispute with the council, which Cyril won.

In general, his papacy was an era of regeneration for the Coptic Orthodox Church and he continued the work begun by Pope Cyril IV (1854–1861) in educational reform.

Notable men of the Coptic Church during his papacy included saint Anba Abraam, Bishop of Fayoum, and Habib Girgis.

In 1881 the Ethiopian Emperor Yohannes IV asked Pope Cyril V to ordain a metropolitan and three Bishops for the Ethiopian Empire. Cyril chose the four monks who had left El-Muharraq Monastery with Anba Abraam: Abouna Petros, Abouna Marqos, Abouna Matewos and Abouna Luqas.

When news of his death reached Ethiopia, Empress Zewditu and Ras Tafari ordered requiem masses to be said throughout Ethiopia, and that government offices be closed for three days.

See also
List of Coptic Orthodox Popes
Pope of the Coptic Orthodox Church
Catechetical School of Alexandria
Prominent Copts
Habib Girgis

References

Sources
 Coptic Orthodox Synaxarium (Book of Saints)
 The Renewal of Coptic Orthodoxy in the Twentieth Century
 Pope Kyrillos V and the reopening of the Theological School of Alexandria in 1893, and appointment of Archdeacon Habib Guirguis as its Dean in 1918

External links
 Pope Kyrillos V – Archive of Contemporary Coptic Orthodox Theology (St Cyril's Coptic Orthodox Theological College)
 The crown of Anba Cyril V, 112th Patriarch (Coptic Museum in Cairo)

Cyril V of Alexandria
1927 deaths
1831 births
People from Beni Suef Governorate
20th-century Coptic Orthodox popes of Alexandria